Polyanin (from поляна meaning meadow) is a Russian masculine surname, its feminine counterpart is Polyanina. It may refer to
Andrei Polyanin (born 1951), Russian mathematician 
Dmitri Polyanin (born 1980), Russian football player

Russian-language surnames